The Dreamcast video game console had several light guns released as accessories between the years of 2000 and 2003. The official light gun from Sega was released in Europe and Asia, but not in the United States due to concerns about bad press soon after the Columbine High School massacre. Instead, an officially licensed light gun was released by Mad Catz for the U.S. market.

Several Dreamcast games support light guns, as well as various homebrew titles. The light guns work with a CRT TV or a CRT VGA monitor in 640x480 mode.

Official light guns

Dreamcast Gun
The Dreamcast Gun is a light gun that was released only in Europe and Asia, where it is the official light gun for use. It works on American consoles, as all Dreamcast peripherals are region-free. However, American games such as Confidential Mission and House of the Dead 2, are region-locked and will not work with the Japanese gun, displaying a message like "This gun incompatible in North America" (HOTD2). Other North American releases, such as Virtua Cop 2 are not soft-locked.  Not releasing and locking out the official gun in North America was an intentional move on Sega's part, who were worried about bad press after the Columbine High School massacre. Instead, Mad Catz released an officially licensed light gun in America, which does work with Sega's US gun games. The official European and Asian Dreamcast Gun does not work with any American games. American consoles can run Japanese games using this gun since it is the software that disallows the gun, not the console.

The pistol-shaped gun has one expansion slot that is compatible with the VMU and the vibration pack.

Dream Blaster

Mad Catz's Dream Blaster is the official Dreamcast light gun for use in the United States. It features official Sega branding on the side of the gun and has a design mimicking the Dreamcast Gun. This gun also features an auto-reload feature. However, unlike the Star Fire Light Blaster, it lacks the delay, thus giving the player an infinite stream of ammunition.

Unofficial light guns

StarFire LightBlaster

This light gun was manufactured by Interact. This accessory features a directional pad on its left side and two start and B buttons on each side. It has an auto-reload trigger (located just in front of the gun trigger). With a Jump Pack plugged in, it can simulate recoil when shots are fired. The left side has a 4-way mode switch, they are 1. Normal, 2. Intelligent reload, 3. Auto fire, and 4. Auto reload plus Auto fire Modes.

SRC Bio Gun

The Bio Gun is identical in form to the Saturn light gun, but is a beige color similar to the Dreamcast console.  It incorporates auto fire and auto reload functions, has internal vibration, an 8-way directional pad, and B/Start buttons.

If the "Silent Scope" mode is chosen with the mode selector, the player can control the scope with the 8-way directional pad at the side like with the analog stick on the normal pad. There is a mode selector switch at the side of the gun. The selector switch has two modes, auto and single fire.

Virtual Blaster
The Virtual Blaster is a third party "made in China" light gun for the Dreamcast. It bears the brand name Topmax.

It looks very similar to the Dream Blaster except that it is slightly shorter and does not have a rubber grip. It has a small 8-directional D-Pad, B and START button on the back of the gun. There are 3 shooting modes: manual, auto-reload and auto-fire/reload (3-position slider button on the left side of the barrel). The auto-fire/reload does not have any delay. It has a VMU slot, but a rumble pack is unnecessary as it has a built-in vibration function that can be switched off with the 2-position slider button on the right side of the barrel.

DCX Blaster
The DCX Blaster is an almost exact clone of the original Dreamcast Gun, except that it is painted black and has minor stylistic variations. It features a single expansion slot and is compatible in all regions. It has variable firing configurations which include manual-reload & triggered-fire, auto-reload & triggered-fire, and auto-reload & auto-fire.

Hais DC Lightgun with Kick-Back
Hais DC Lightgun with Kick-Back has 3 modes of operation which are selected using a switch: "Normal" (single shot), "AR" (single shot with auto reload) and "AR+AF" (automatic fire with automatic reload). The gun features a kick-back feature where the slide actually kicks back and forth every shot (which can be disabled using a switch). For this functionality, however, the gun requires an additional power supply to be plugged into the gun's plug on the Dreamcast console.

The gun is modeled after a Desert Eagle, and is white with orange buttons. There are also versions sold under the "Desert Eagle" label that are all black. There is no VMU slot. The gun features a D-pad and Start and B buttons beneath the barrel and an additional B Button is on the grip itself. Though the hammer is articulated, it has no function.

Hais also released a Guncon 2 version for the PlayStation 2

Hais DC Mini Gun
The Hais DC Mini Gun has both single shot and autofire capabilities and has a built-in vibration function (which can be disabled using a switch). The gun is small in comparison to other light guns for the Dreamcast. There are no expansion slots. The gun features a directional pad and Start and B buttons beneath the barrel. The trigger uses a plastic slide, as opposed to hinged triggers, which produce clicking noises. The orange plastic hammer of the gun is actually a functional button capable of triggering a secondary weapon.

Yobo Gameware DC Lightgun
Yobo DC Lightgun has 3 modes of operation which are selected using a switch: "Normal" (single shot), "AR" (single shot with auto reload) and "AF" (automatic fire with automatic reload). It also has a vibration on/off switch. It looks like the original Dreamcast Gun but bulkier. There is an expansion slot. The gun features a D-pad with Start and B buttons above the grip along with the trigger.

SRC DC Wireless Gun
This Dreamcast light gun was modeled after light guns traditionally used in arcades. It is wireless and uses a transmitter that utilizes infrared signals. The box gives these instructions:
For best results, the SRC DC should stay within four meters of the receiver
The distance between the receiver and the TV should not exceed one meter
The light gun uses one 9V battery to power the IR transmitter 
The receiver has a mode selection switch that allows it to be used with Silent Scope

Pelican Stinger
A gun by Pelican.
Reload Trigger for rapid manual reloading of bullets 
Built-in Jolt Action with On/Off Selector
Auto Reload Mode: Single fire with automatic bullet reload
Turbo Fire Mode: Turbo fire with automatic bullet reload
Rubberized Head Grips 
Compatible with VMU and jump pack

ThrustMaster Pump Action Light gun
A gun by Thrustmaster (Thrust Master)
Black and white colours with THRUSTMASTER logo
Supports different modes of fire

Terra Nexus Light Gun
The gun is grey with orange buttons and carries the imprint "Terra Nexus 12mm" together with a switch on the side. The other side has a digital pad, three buttons and another switch. The front carries a red LED to simulate a laser targeting system.

Supported games

Commercial games
Death Crimson OX (Only the Japanese release supports the European light-guns)
Death Crimson 2 (Japan only release)
Demolition Racer: No Exit (North America only release, light gun supported only in 'Big Car Hunter' minigame)
Confidential Mission
House of the Dead 2
Virtua Cop 2 (as part of the Sega Smash Pack in North America, as a standalone release in Japan, not released in PAL regions in any form)

Freeware games
bloop
SMSPlus
NesterDC
Pop a Cap
Revolver

External links
CRT vs LCD, Video Inputs, Lightguns on HD
CNN Review of the Mad Catz Dream Blaster
Specifications on the DC X Light gun
eStarland Pelican Stinger Product Page

Sega hardware
Light guns